The Beyazıt massacre or 16 March massacre of 16 March 1978 was the massacre of students at Istanbul University, in which 7 died and 41 were injured. The university was attacked with a bomb and gunfire. The head of the Istanbul branch of the Grey Wolves, Orhan Çakıroğlu, was sentenced to 11 years in 1980; he was released on appeal in 1982. After the 30-year statute of limitations expired the mother of one of the shooters admitted his involvement, and said he had received orders from a police officer. A witness said the police did not pursue the attackers at the scene.

List of victims 
7 students killed in the massacre can be listed as,

 Abdullah Şimşek
 Baki Ekiz 
 Cemil Sönmez
 Hamit Akıl
 Hatice Özen
 Murat Kurt
 Turan Ören

References

See also 
 List of massacres in Turkey

Political violence in Turkey
Mass murder in 1978
Massacres in 1978
March 1978 crimes
Massacres in Turkey
Grey Wolves (organization) attacks
Mass murder in Turkey
Istanbul University
March 1978 events in Europe
1970s in Istanbul
1978 in Turkey
1978 murders in Turkey